The following list of Carnegie libraries in Colorado provides detailed information on United States Carnegie libraries in Colorado, where 35 public libraries were built from 27 grants (totaling $749,943) awarded by the Carnegie Corporation of New York from 1899 to 1917. As of 2010, 30 of these buildings are still standing, and 18 still operate as libraries. In addition, the University of Denver was awarded an academic library building on April 16, 1906, with a $30,000 grant.

Key

Public libraries

Notes

References

Note: The above references, while all authoritative, are not entirely mutually consistent. Some details of this list may have been drawn from one of the references (usually Jones) without support from the others.  Reader discretion is advised.

Colorado
 
Libraries
Libraries